Oscar Valentín Leal Caal (20 February 1971 – 13 January 2012) was a Guatemalan politician. He was elected to the Congress of Guatemala in 2008, and again in 2011 for the Renewed Democratic Liberty party. Shortly before being inaugurated in the new legislature he switched to the Patriotic Party.   He was a former Governor of Alta Verapaz, and a former Mayor of San Juan Chamelco.

Assassination

On 13 January 2012, Leal and his brother were shot dead in their car by gunmen riding motorcycles in Guatemala City. The shootings occurred the day before Otto Molina was sworn in as the new President of Guatemala.

References

1971 births
2012 deaths
Assassinated Guatemalan politicians
Governors of Alta Verapaz Department
Mayors of places in Guatemala
Members of the Congress of Guatemala
National Unity of Hope politicians
Patriotic Party (Guatemala) politicians
Renewed Democratic Liberty politicians
People from Alta Verapaz Department